Inosculation is a natural phenomenon in which trunks, branches or roots of two trees grow together in a manner biologically similar to the artificial process of grafting.  The term is derived from the Latin roots in + ōsculārī, "to kiss into/inward/against" or etymologically and more illustratively "to make a small mouth inward/into/against"; trees having undergone the process are referred to in forestry as gemels, from the Latin word meaning "a pair".

It is most common for branches of two trees of the same species to grow together, though inosculation may be noted across related species. The branches first grow separately in proximity to each other until they touch. At this point, the bark on the touching surfaces is gradually abraded away as the trees move in the wind. Once the cambium of two trees touches, they sometimes self-graft and grow together as they expand in diameter. Inosculation customarily results when tree limbs are braided or pleached.

The term inosculation is also used in the context of plastic surgery, as one of the three mechanisms by which skin grafts take at the host site. Blood vessels from the recipient site are believed to connect with those of the graft in order to restore vascularity.

Species
Inosculation is most common among the following taxa due to their thin bark:

Apple
Almond
Ash
Beech
Crepe myrtle
Chestnut
Dogwood
Elm
Ficus
Grape
Hazelnut
Hornbeam
Laburnum
Linden
Maple
Norway spruce
Olive
Peach
Pear
Privet
River red gum
Sycamore
Willow
Wisteria

Conjoined trees
Two trees may grow to their mature size adjacent to each other and seemingly grow together or conjoin, demonstrating inosculation. These may be of the same species or even of different genera or families, depending on whether the two trees have become truly grafted together (once the cambium of two trees touches, they self-graft and grow together). Usually grafting is only between two trees of the same or closely related species or genera, but the appearance of grafting can be given by two trees that are physically touching, rubbing, intertwined, or entangled. Both conifers and deciduous trees can become conjoined. Beech trees in particular are frequent conjoiners, as is blackthorn (Prunus spinosa).

Such trees are often colloquially referred to as "husband and wife" trees, or "marriage trees". The straightforward application of the term comes from the obvious unification of two separate individual trees, although a more humorous use of the term relates to the sexually suggestive appearance of some natural examples. There may be a degree of religious intent, as some cults are organized around beliefs that trees contain a hidden or sacred power to cure or to enhance fertility, or that they contain the souls of ancestors or of the unborn.

Examples
At the ruined Lynncraigs Farm, Dalry, North Ayrshire in Scotland, a blackthorn (Prunus spinosa), standing in the old farm garden, shows signs of having been deliberately grafted.

On his Tour of Scotland, published in 1800, T. Garnett notes a tree near Inveraray that the locals called the Marriage tree, formed from a lime tree with two trunks that have been joined by a branch in the manner of a person putting an arm around another (see illustration) as would a married couple.

On the way to the Heavenly Lake near Urumqi in China are a pair of trees that local people have called the Husband and Wife trees because they are connected by a living branch. The Tatajia Husband and Wife trees are in Taiwan and in Yakushima, Kagoshima-ken, Japan, are a pair of Husband and Wife trees formed from conjoined cedars.

In Lambeg, Co. Down, slightly north of Wolfenden's Bridge, stand two beech trees (see 'Gallery') at the entrance to Chrome Hill, on the Lambeg to Ballyskeagh road. In the late 18th century, John Wesley was staying at Chrome Hill and decided to weave together two young beech trees to act as a symbol of unity between the Methodist Church and the Church of Ireland.

At Doonholm near Ayr an ancient sycamore maple (Acer pseudoplatanus) was famous for the multiple fusion of its boughs that gave it a unique appearance and greatly strengthened it.

Gallery

See also
Axel Erlandson
John Krubsack
Tree shaping

References

Notes

Sources
 Garnett, T. (1800). Observations on a Tour of the Highlands and part of the Western Isles of Scotland. London : Cadell & Davies.
 MacArthur, Wilson. (1952). The River Doon. London : Cassell & Co. Ltd.
 Morton, John (1712). The Natural History of Northhamptonshire. London : R.Knaplock.

External links

Video footage of Gemel trees in Ayrshire
 Tree Marriages in India

Horticulture
Plant physiology